is an action racing video game published by Imagineer, which was released exclusively in Japan in 1994 for the Super Famicom.

Gameplay
This video game is reminiscent of Atari's Super Sprint and Badlands. A top-down perspective is used and elements of the video game Bomberman are added in. An automatic steering mode is also available.

The goal of the game is to take a group of small futuristic air bikes and to go around one of the various race tracks. Players race each other to see who makes it to the finish line first. Various hazards are also scattered around each track, from puddles to speed bumps, pinball bumpers and even cannonballs. There are 12 courses (including the hidden bonus course). A "Challenge Mode" is also available.

References

External links
 Battle Cross reviews at GameFAQs
Battle Cross at superfamicom.org
Japanese title at super-famicom.jp 

1994 video games
A-Max games
Imagineer games
Japan-exclusive video games
Racing video games
Super Nintendo Entertainment System games
Super Nintendo Entertainment System-only games
Vehicular combat games
Multiplayer and single-player video games
Video games developed in Japan